Dr Terror's House of Horrors is a 1965 British anthology horror film from Amicus Productions, directed by veteran horror director Freddie Francis, written by Milton Subotsky, and starring Peter Cushing and Christopher Lee.

It was the first in a series of anthology films from Amicus and was followed by Torture Garden (1967), The House That Dripped Blood (1970), Tales from the Crypt (1972), Asylum (1972), The Vault of Horror (1973) and From Beyond the Grave (1974). It is also the first horror film from Amicus.

Plot (including cast list)

Five men enter a train carriage in London bound for (the fictional town of) Bradley, and are joined by a sixth, the mysterious Doctor Schreck (Peter Cushing) whose name, he mentions, is German for "terror".  During the journey, the doctor opens his pack of Tarot cards (which he calls his "House of Horrors") and proceeds to reveal the destinies of each of the travellers. This provides the framework to tell five horror stories.

 Peter Cushing - Dr. Schreck

Werewolf
Architect Jim Dawson (Neil McCallum) returns to his old family home on a Scottish isle to make renovations for the new owner, Mrs. Biddulph (Ursula Howells). Biddulph explains she bought the secluded house to help her recover from the death of her husband, to whose memory she would like to dedicate a newly enlarged room as a museum.

Dawson finds behind a fake wall in the cellar the coffin of Count Cosmo Valdemar. Valdemar, the original owner of the house, was killed in a conflict with the Dawson family centuries ago. Local legend states that Valdemar would reclaim his former home and take revenge on the current owner. Dawson discovers that Valdemar is rising at night as a werewolf, and has already killed a housemaid (Katy Wild).

Believing Mrs. Biddulph to be in danger, he makes silver bullets out of an ancestral cross that was produced from the sword historically used to kill the monster. However, when the creature surges again from his tomb in the cellar, Dawson is baffled to find such bullets ineffective. He runs upstairs to protect Mrs. Biddulph within her room, but the lady reveals that she has replaced the ammunition with ordinary ones. She clarifies how the actual curse meant that Valdemar will take revenge on the last descendant of the Dawson clan, not on the current owner of the estate; and that his death and placement in Valdemar's coffin will fully restore the werewolf to life in human form. It was all a trap: Biddulph is Valdemar's wife, who has returned from the grave after 200 years and proceeds to attack and kill Dawson.

 Neil McCallum - Jim Dawson
 Ursula Howells - Deirdre Biddulph
 Peter Madden - Caleb
 Katy Wild - Valda
 Edward Underdown - Tod

Creeping Vine
Bill Rogers (Alan Freeman) and his wife and daughter (Ann Bell and Sarah Nicholls) return from their holiday to discover a fast-growing vine in the garden. When the plant seems to respond violently to attempts to cut it down, Rogers goes to the Ministry of Defence, where he gets advice from a couple of scientists (played by Bernard Lee and Jeremy Kemp). The plant shows increasing signs of intelligence, murderous intent and self-preservation, first killing the family dog, then one of the scientist and finally blocking all windows and doors to the house, and even snapping the phone line. Fire appears for a few moments to scare it away, until that too becomes ineffective as the vine learns to put out a flame.

 Ann Bell - Ann Rogers
 Bernard Lee - Hopkins
 Alan Freeman - Bill Rogers
 Jeremy Kemp - Jerry Drake
 Sarah Nicholls - Carol Rogers

Voodoo
Biff Bailey (Roy Castle) is a happy-go-lucky jazz musician, who promptly accepts a gig in the West Indies with his band. Upon witnessing a local voodoo ceremony, he loves the exotic rhythm and tries to pitch on the natives the idea to use it as template for new commercial music.
Despite warnings not to "steal" the sacred tunes from the god, Biff tries to use them for a jazz performance back in London, overtly mocking that religion. The show is suddenly halted by a stormy wind which makes the public flee, and leads Bailey as well to leave the stage and stumble in the streets until he comes across a garish poster for "Dr Terror's House of Horrors". 
This story may be  based on the short story "Papa Benjamin" by Cornell Woolrich, which was also adapted by the television series Thriller and the radio series Suspense. The quintet of British jazz saxophonist Tubby Hayes appears as Bailey's backing band.

 Roy Castle - Biff Bailey
 Kenny Lynch - Sammy Coin
 Harold Lang - Roy Shine
 Christopher Carlos - Vrim
 Thomas Baptiste - Dambala

Disembodied Hand
Pompous art critic Franklyn Marsh (Christopher Lee) seems more concerned with his own devastating wit than art itself. 
Painter Eric Landor (Michael Gough) bears the brunt of one of Marsh's tirades, but gets even by humiliating the critic publicly. He shows that Marsh mistakes the work of a chimpanzee for modern art, and subsequently follows him at public speeches and social gatherings, silencing his contributions mid-way with shameful reminders of the error.
Increasingly exasperated, finally Marsh retaliates by running over Landor with his car, causing Landor to lose the right hand. Unable to paint any more, Landor commits suicide. From this moment Marsh is tormented by the disembodied hand of the artist, which seems immune to fire and any other attempts to contain it. In a last attack while Marsh is driving, the car crashes and the broken window leads to Marsh's permanent blindness.

 Christopher Lee - Franklyn Marsh
 Michael Gough - Eric Landor
 Isla Blair - Pretty girl
 Judy Cornwell - Nurse
 Hedger Wallace - Surgeon

Vampire
Dr Bob Carroll (Donald Sutherland) returns to his home in the United States with his new French bride, Nicolle (Jennifer Jayne). Soon there is evidence that a vampire is on the loose, and Carroll seeks the aid of his colleague, Dr Blake (Max Adrian). They find that Nicolle is the vampire. Following Blake's advice, Carroll kills Nicolle. When the police come to arrest Carroll for his wife's murder, Blake denies giving any such advice. As the police take Carroll away, Blake says to himself that the town isn't big enough for two doctors or two vampires, and he turns into a bat.

 Max Adrian - Dr. Blake
 Jennifer Jayne - Nicolle Carroll
 Donald Sutherland - Dr. Bob Carroll
 Al Mulock - Detective

Epilogue
The frame story ends with a twist. After showing sympathy to all his fellow passengers and attempting not to show them the prediction of death that all received from the tarots' deck,  Dr. Schreck informs the men that this would be the only way that they could escape the forecast of an even more horrible destiny. 
He then vanishes during a moment of darkness. Puzzled and fearful, the men have a moment of relief when the train stops and they assume this to mean having reached the intended destination.
At the station however they are alone in a dark, silent and spooky atmosphere. Suddenly the wind carries a newspaper, with the report of an accident in which they all died. Schreck reappears in a black mantel, and he is revealed to be Death himself. The men begin to slowly follow him in the darkness as the credits roll.

Production
Dr. Terror's House of Horrors was a conscious attempt by Milton Subotsky to repeat the success of Dead of Night (1945). Subotsky considered that movie to be "the greatest horror film ever," and used it as a blueprint for Dr. Terror and the rest of Amicus's portmanteau films. The script began as a stillborn television series in 1948 during the time when Dead of Night was a recent release.  Subotsky wrote the original stories in 1948 when he was employed as a scriptwriter for NBC's Lights Out series.

Donald Sutherland was paid £1,000 for his performance.

Filming
Filming began on Dr. Terror's House of Horrors at Shepperton Studios on 25 May 1964 with a budget of £105,000 and was completed on 3 July 1964.

It was filmed using the cinematic process known as Techniscope.

Critical reception

In a contemporary review, Variety noted "a usefully chilly package deal which will offer audiences several mild shudders and quite a lot of amusement. Even though occasional giggles set in, the cast, headed by experienced horror practitioners such as Peter Cushing, Michael Gough, Christopher Lee and Max Adrian, sensibly play it straight." Chris Coffel from Bloody Disgusting called the film "an Underrated Horror Anthology", and commended the film's cinematography.

See also 
The Beast with Five Fingers
The Hand
Tales That Witness Madness

References
General

Specific

External links

 
 
 

1965 films
1965 horror films
Amicus Productions films
British horror anthology films
British supernatural horror films
1960s English-language films
Films about plants
Films directed by Freddie Francis
Films scored by Elisabeth Lutyens
Films set on trains
Fiction about Haitian Vodou
British natural horror films
Films about personifications of death
Supernatural slasher films
Tarot in fiction
British vampire films
British werewolf films
1960s British films